Adam Gidwitz (born February 14, 1982) is the author of the best selling children's books  A Tale Dark and Grimm (2010), In a Glass Grimmly (2012), and The Grimm Conclusion (2013), all published by Dutton Books for Young Readers, an imprint of Penguin Random House. He received a 2017 Newbery Honor for The Inquisitor’s Tale: Or, The Three Magical Children and Their Holy Dog (2016).  In 2021, his book A Tale Dark and Grimm was adapted into an animated miniseries on Netflix.

Early life
He was born in San Francisco in 1982 but grew up in Baltimore, Maryland. His grandfather, Willard Gidwitz, was a president at Helene Curtis. Through his father's family, he is also related to Illinois GOP gubernatorial candidate and Trump appointee Ronald Gidwitz. He attended Columbia University, where he majored in English literature and spent his junior year abroad in the university's Oxford/Cambridge Scholars program. After college he became a teacher at Saint Ann's School in Brooklyn. He credits a stint as a substitute librarian as the inspiration for writing The Grimm Trilogy. He now lives in Brooklyn, New York, with his wife, writing full-time.

Awards and Recognitions
A Tale Dark and Grimm was named a New York Times Editor's Choice, A Publishers Weekly Best Children's Book of the Year (2010), a School Library Journal Best Children's Book of the Year (2010), and a 2010 ALA Notable Book.  An animated series based on the book was one of the top ten most watched shows for kids on Netflix in October 2021.

The Inquisitor's Tale Or, The Three Magical Children and Their Holy Dog was awarded a Newbery Honor on January 23, 2017. The book also received the Sydney Taylor Book Award for Older Readers in 2017.

Bibliography
 A Tale Dark and Grimm. New York: Dutton Penguin, 2010. 
 In a Glass Grimmly. New York: Dutton Penguin, 2012. 
 The Grimm Conclusion. New York: Dutton Penguin, 2013.
 The Empire Strikes Back - So You Want to Be a Jedi. Los Angeles, Disney Lucasfilm Press, 2015. 
 The Inquisitor’s Tale: Or, The Three Magical Children and Their Holy Dog. New York: Dutton Penguin, 2016.
 The Creature of the Pines (The Unicorn Rescue Society, #1). Illustrated by Hatem Aly. New York: Dutton Penguin, 2018.
 The Basque Dragon (The Unicorn Rescue Society, #2). Co-authored by Jesse Casey. Illustrated by Hatem Aly. New York: Dutton Penguin, 2018.
 Sasquatch and the Muckleshoot (The Unicorn Rescue Society, #3). Co-authored by Joseph Bruchac. Illustrated by Hatem Aly. New York: Dutton Penguin, 2018.
 The Chupacabras of the Rio Grande (The Unicorn Rescue Society, #4). Co-authored by David Bowles. Illustrated by Hatem Aly. New York: Dutton Penguin, 2019. (Forthcoming.)

References

External links 

 
 The New York Times, "When Stories Had Sharp Teeth" 
 American Library Association Notable Book List 

1982 births
Living people
Writers from California
American children's writers
Park School of Baltimore alumni
People from San Francisco
Columbia College (New York) alumni